Jonathan Caruana (born 24 July 1986 in Malta) is a professional footballer who plays for Maltese Premier League side Valletta, where he plays as a defender.

On 26 September 2017, Caruana was handed a four-year ban from football. The 31-year-old was provisionally suspended by the Malta Football Association after he returned a positive sample during an out-of-competition test conducted by the National Anti-Doping Organisation (NADO) back in March 2017. In September 2018 after having his ban cut short, he returned to Valletta.

Playing career

Hibernians
Caruana started his career with Hibernians, and made his debut during the 2003–04 season. Making the transition from youth team to first team, he was only used as a bit part player, and went on to make just one appearance during the season, with Hibernians going on to finish in third position in the Maltese Premier League.

The 2004–05 season, saw Caruana gain a few more first team opportunities. He helped Hibernians to another third-place finish in the Maltese Premier League, with Caruana going on to make four appearances, without scoring and goals.

Caruana still struggled to make his mark in the Hibernians first team, and went into the 2005–06 season hoping to establish himself. Caruana still failed to mark a first team place his own and up to the January transfer window of 2006, he only made one appearance. He was sent out of loan for the remainder of the season to fellow Maltese Premier League team Mosta, who were struggling against relegation. He made 17 appearances, without scoring, but unfortunately Mosta failed to avoid relegation after finishing in ninth position in the Maltese Premier League. Caruana's parent club, Hibernians went on to secure a fourth-place finish.

Caruana returned to Hibernians for the 2006–07 season. The loan move had paid off, as Caruana cemented a first team place, making 19 appearances, but failing to score as Hibernians finished in fifth position in the Maltese Premier League. He did gain his first taste of success as Hibernians secured the Maltese Cup for the second consecutive season.

The 2007–08 season turned out to be a very disappointing one for Hibernians, as the club finished the first phase of the season in the relegation pool, before finishing the season in seventh position. Caruana went on to make 21 appearances, but failed to score any goals. However, the club won the Maltese Super Cup. Caruana's form did however not go unnoticed, as he received his first cap for the Maltese national team during the season.

Hibernians went from one extreme to the other during the 2008–09 season. Under the guidance of new manager Mark Miller, the club shocked the critics and beat Valletta by two points to win the Maltese Premier League title. Caruana made 26 appearances and chipped in with three goals.

Caruana hoped to help Hibernians retain the Maltese Premier League title for the 2009–10, however the quest took some severe setbacks, as Hibernians sold the Maltese Player of the Year, Clayton Failla to Sliema Wanderers, and striker, Terence Scerri joined Valletta.

Honours
Hibernians
 Maltese Premier League: 2008–09
 Maltese FA Trophy: 2007
 Maltese Super Cup: 2007

Valletta
 Maltese Super Cup: 2011, 2012
 Maltese Premier League: 2010–11, 2011–12

Individual
 Malta Football Awards
 Best Defence
 Winner: 2010–2011 with Valletta F.C.
 Winner: 2011–2012 with Valletta F.C.

Career statistics
Statistics accurate as of match played 9 August 2009.

International goals
Scores and results list Malta's goal tally first.

References

External links
 

1986 births
Living people
Maltese footballers
Association football defenders
Hibernians F.C. players
Mosta F.C. players
Valletta F.C. players
Maltese Premier League players
Malta youth international footballers
Malta under-21 international footballers
Malta international footballers